John "Irish" Earle (6 October 1944 – 7 May 2008) was an Irish saxophonist, best known for his solo on Thin Lizzy's live versions of "Dancing in the Moonlight", such as that on their live album Live and Dangerous. He also worked with Ian Dury, Graham Parker, Gnidrolog, Rory Gallagher, The Boomtown Rats, Randy Crawford, Shakin' Stevens and many others

Biography
Earle went to school at Synge Street CBS, and started playing the clarinet as a young boy, and later graduated to saxophone. After a short career as a commercial artist he started his professional music career in the mid-1960s, playing in showbands that were popular in Ireland at the time. In 1966 he moved to Libya to play in a covers band on Wheelus Air Force base for US Air Force personnel. Following this he moved to Germany to perform for US servicemen on other US bases, performing covers of popular chart hits. Around this time he was given the nickname "Irish" by fellow band members to identify him from two other Johns playing in the same band, this stuck with him throughout his career in the UK. Towards the end of the decade , he joined Krautrock band Nine Days Wonder, performing in clubs across Europe and recording his first album with them.

In 1972, Earle left Germany and moved to England to further his career. After a spell with progressive rock band Gnidrolog, there was a lack of musical work so he took a job in a record packing house distributing albums, including Gnidrolog's. While attending various auditions and jam sessions, he met Ian Dury by chance in the Hope and Anchor, Islington, which led to him becoming a member of his backing band Kilburn and the High Roads. In 1977 he performed and solo'd on the song "England's Glory", written by Dury, performed by English music hall veteran Max Wall and produced by Dave Edmunds. He also worked at the newly reopened Rainbow Theatre as a member of the stage crew during 1977.

Following an introduction to Stiff Records supremo and fellow Dubliner Dave Robinson he progressed to playing in Graham Parker and The Rumour in the mid-1970s, playing on the albums Heat Treatment and Stick to Me and it was through their connection as support band to Thin Lizzy in 1976 that he was invited to play saxophone during Lizzy's main set. He later played on The Clash's album London Calling, playing double-tracked baritone saxophone on the track "The Right Profile".

Earle later moved back to Ireland, residing in Rathmines, Dublin. He frequently played with local blues and jazz musicians including Peter Moore, Ben Prevo, Ali & The Dts, The Hot Jazz Trio and Thin Lizzy tribute band Thin as Lizzy.

He died on 7 May 2008 at the age of 63.

References

1944 births
2008 deaths
Musicians from Dublin (city)
Rock saxophonists
20th-century Irish musicians
21st-century Irish musicians
Irish saxophonists
Irish blues musicians
Irish jazz musicians
20th-century saxophonists
People educated at Synge Street CBS